The 1968–69 season was the 45th season in the existence of AEK Athens F.C. and the tenth consecutive season in the top flight of Greek football. They competed in the Alpha Ethniki, the Greek Cup and the European Cup. The season began on 18 September 1968 and finished on 15 June 1969.

Overview

The 1968–69 season found AEK in a transitional year with the changing of the coach, as the way of training the football players changed radically. The championship win in 1968 was accompanied by the departure of Jenő Csaknády and the arrival of an equally capable coach was deemed imperative. Thus, the great Yugoslav Branko Stanković was hired, who had already presented great achievements as a technician, with Vojvodina and as a member of the coaching staff at Yugoslavia. The management of the team, due to a lack of sufficient money, did not proceed with big transfer moves. They acquired a couple of young footballers from smaller clubs, while also counted on players such Lavaridis, Stathopoulos, Simigdalas, Sevastopoulos, Ventouris, who were previously decommissioned. The preparation of the team under Stanković was based on the modern football of the period based on the tactics, technique and the physical strength, while the discipline of each footballer was a prerequisite for his progress as well as that of the team. However, due to the footballers had not yet adapted to the new way of working to fully respond to it, the several injuries that limited the options and the advanced age of some players that needed renewal, AEK started very badly in the championship. Afterwards, they continued with five consecutive victories. One of these was an emphatic 2–3 away win against Olympiacos with Papaioannou playing as goalkeeper from the 85th minute, due to the suspension of Serafidis and even making two great saves and securing the great victory.

For the first round of the European Cup AEK were lucky to be drawn against Jeunesse Esch from Luxembourg. At Nea Filadelfeia, the club prevailded harder than the final 3–0 implied. The qualification was at safety and the rematch became purely procedural. At Luxembourg, the suspense of qualification lasted for 16 minutes when AEK equalized the quick goal of Jeunesse Eschs. AEK also managed to take the lead with a second goal by Ventouris, but the players of Legrand showing character evenatully turned the match again taking the victory. In the second round AEK were facing the Danish Akademisk Boldklub. At AEK Stadium, despite their offensive style of play, AEK played defensively for the whole match and managed to take the draw by 0–0. At the rematch in the frozen Copenhagen, AEK started the match very offensively and managed to take the lead early on with Stamatiadis. The Danes started to press unbearably to equalize, but thanks to Konstantinidis and Vasiliou, AEK went for the half time break with their lead in tact. In the second half the "yellow blacks" took advantage of the open spaces left by the Danes and played to extend their lead. Αt the 81st minute, after a cross by Sevastopoulos and Papaioannou with his unnatural jump, beat everyone in the air and made the final 0–2. AEK achieved the very first display of a Greek team in Europe, as they became the first team to achieve an away victory in a European match and the first Greek team to reach the quarter-finals of the European Cup, or in any European competition at all. In the quarter-finals AEK avoided all the giants of the draw as they faced the Czechoslovakian Spartak Trnava. At the first match at Spartak Stadium AEK played to maintain a favourable score for the rematch and after they withstood the pressure of the Czechoslovaks and despite the two goals, they managed to reduce their lead with Sevastopoulos and achieve their target. The rematch in Athens, AEK seemed ready to respond to their challenge and take the qualification. Unfortunately, after a quick goal by the Czechoslovaks, the "yellow-blacks" were forced to chase the score, as Spartak closed all spaces behind. AEK attacked with everything they got by the Czechoslovak defense seemed impenetrable. Nonetheless, at the 77th minute AEK managed to equalize with Papaioannou and had only 13 minute to take the match to the extra time. Even though the team pressed intensively for another goal the ball would not go in the net and AEK left the tournament with pride, as they made one of their greatest ever achievements reality.

In the Cup AEK easily eliminated Lamia, at the round of 32 with 5–0 at home. At the round of 16 they faced Panachaiki and were eliminated with a 4–2 away defeat. AEK were consistently close in claiming the title, until they were defeated at home 0–1 by Olympiacos at the 22nd matchday. The end of the championship found AEK in the 6th place with 74 points and a long distance from the champion Panathinaikos with 90 points. As a result, they didn't qualify in any European competition for the next season. At the end of the season, Stanković planned a big renewal of the team's roster in order to improve their weaknesses and make their comeback in claiming titles. The principles of this renewal were based in finding players that would increase the team's height, reduce the team's age average and discipline to the coach's plan during matches.

Players

Squad information

NOTE: The players are the ones that have been announced by the AEK Athens' press release. No edits should be made unless a player arrival or exit is announced. Updated 30 June 1969, 23:59 UTC+2.

Transfers

In

Out

Loan out

Renewals

Overall transfer activity

Expenditure:  ₯120,000

Income:  ₯0

Net Total:  ₯120,000

Pre-season and friendlies

Alpha Ethniki

League table

Results summary

Results by Matchday

Fixtures

Greek Cup

Matches

European Cup

First round

Second round

Quarter-finals

Statistics

Squad statistics

! colspan="11" style="background:#FFDE00; text-align:center" | Goalkeepers
|-

! colspan="11" style="background:#FFDE00; color:black; text-align:center;"| Defenders
|-

! colspan="11" style="background:#FFDE00; color:black; text-align:center;"| Midfielders
|-

! colspan="11" style="background:#FFDE00; color:black; text-align:center;"| Forwards
|-

! colspan="11" style="background:#FFDE00; color:black; text-align:center;"| Left during season
|-

|}

Disciplinary record

|-
! colspan="17" style="background:#FFDE00; text-align:center" | Goalkeepers

|-
! colspan="17" style="background:#FFDE00; color:black; text-align:center;"| Defenders

|-
! colspan="17" style="background:#FFDE00; color:black; text-align:center;"| Midfielders

|-
! colspan="17" style="background:#FFDE00; color:black; text-align:center;"| Forwards

|-
! colspan="17" style="background:#FFDE00; color:black; text-align:center;"| Left during season

|}

References

External links
AEK Athens F.C. Official Website

AEK Athens F.C. seasons
AEK Athens